Statistics of Dhivehi League in the 2011 season.

Clubs
All Youth Linkage FC
Club Eagles
Club Valencia
Club Vyansa
Maziya S&RC
New Radiant SC
VB Sports Club
Victory Sports Club

Standings
Format: In Round 1 and Round 2, all eight teams played against each other. Top six teams after Round 2 play against each other in Round 3. Teams with most total points after Round 3 are crowned the Dhivehi League champions and qualify for the AFC Cup. The top four teams qualify for the President's Cup. Bottom two teams after Round 2 play against top two teams of Second Division in Dhivehi League Qualification for places in next year's Dhivehi League.

Promotion/relegation playoff

References
Dhiraagu Dhivehi League Standings (2011)
Dhivehi League Qualification Standings (2011)
President's Cup Standings (2011)

External links
Football Association of Maldives

Dhivehi League seasons
Maldives
Maldives
1